Argynnini is a tribe of butterflies in the subfamily Heliconiinae, containing some of the fritillaries. This group has roughly 100 species worldwide and roughly 30 in North America.

Systematics
This group has also been classified as subtribe Argynnina of the Heliconiini, or even as a distinct subfamily Argynninae in the Nymphalidae.

Genera
Following studies of molecular phylogeny, genus delimitation has been unstable in recent years. Several earlier genera are now junior synonyms of Argynnis (Argyreus, Argyronome, Damora and others, but Speyeria and Fabriciana have been split off again). Similarly, Boloria now includes Clossiana and Proclossiana, and Issoria includes Kuekenthaliella.

 Euptoieta Doubleday, 1848
 Pardopsis Trimen, 1887 (uncertain placement, possibly in Acraeini)
 Yramea Reuss, 1920
 Boloria Moore, 1900 (now including Clossiana and Proclossiana)
 Issoria Hübner, 1819
 Brenthis Hübner, 1819
 Argynnis Fabricius, 1807
 Speyeria Scudder, 1872 (previously included in Argynnis)
 Fabriciana Reuss, 1920 (previously included in Argynnis)

References

 

Butterfly tribes